Probythinella protera is a species of very small aquatic snail, an operculate gastropod mollusk in the family Hydrobiidae.

Distribution
 Gulf of Mexico

Description 
The maximum recorded shell length is 3.6 mm.

Habitat 
Minimum recorded depth is 0 m. Maximum recorded depth is 2 m.

References

Hydrobiidae
Gastropods described in 1953